Kavachi is one of the most active submarine volcanoes in the south-west Pacific Ocean. Located south of Vangunu Island in the Solomon Islands, it is Kavachi after a sea god of the New Georgia Group islanders, and is also referred to locally as Rejo te Kavachi ("Kavachi's oven"). The volcano has become emergent and then been eroded back into the sea at least eight times since its first recorded eruption in 1939.

Geography 

Eruptions 

When the volcano erupted in 2003, a  island formed above the surface, but it disappeared soon after. Additional eruptive activity was observed and reported in March 2004 and April 2007. More recent volcanic activity can be inferred from observations of discoloured water around the volcano, in 2020 and January 2021.

Marine life
In 2015, marine wildlife was found living inside Kavachi's crater, including the scalloped hammerhead, the silky shark, and the sixgill stingray.  It has subsequently been given the nickname "Sharkcano" by various media outlets.

See also
List of new islands
Woodlark Basin

References

Further reading
Baker, E.T., Massoth, G.J., de Ronde, C.E.J., Lupton, J.E., Lebon, G., and McInnes, B.I.A. 2002. Observations and sampling of an ongoing subsurface eruption of Kavachi volcano, Solomon Islands, May 2000, Geology, 30 (11), 975–978. (geology.geoscienceworld.org/cgi/reprint/30/11/975.pdf)
Dunkley, P.M., 1983. Volcanism and the evolution of the ensimatic Solomon Islands Arc, in Shimozuro, D. And Yokoyama, I.,(eds.), Arc Volcanism: Physics and Tectonics. Tokyo, Terrapub, 225–241.
Johnson, R.W. and Tuni, D. 1987. Kavachi, an active forearc volcano in the western Solomon Islands: Reported eruptions between 1950 and 1982, in B. Taylor and N.F. Exon, (eds.), 1987, Marine Geology, Geophysics, and Geochemistry of the Woodlark Basin-Solomon Islands, Circum-Pacific Council for Energy and Mineral Resources Earth Science Series, v. 7: Houston, Texas, Circum-Pacific Council for Energy and Mineral Resources.

External links 
Kavachi in action

Active volcanoes
Submarine volcanoes
Volcanoes of the Solomon Islands
Seamounts of the Pacific Ocean
Ephemeral islands